The Ira B. Sweet House is a historic house at 38 Esmond Street in Smithfield, Rhode Island.  It is a -story wood-frame structure, with a mansard roof.  It was built c. 1884–95, and is an unusually late example of Second Empire styling.  Ira Sweet was a local shop owner and the village postmaster until his death c. 1900.  The house is three bays wide and two deep, with a center entry flanked by projecting bay sections topped by bracketed eaves.  A two-story enclosed porch is attached to the right side, and additions extend the house further to the rear.

The house was listed on the National Register of Historic Places in 2010.

See also
National Register of Historic Places listings in Providence County, Rhode Island

References

Houses on the National Register of Historic Places in Rhode Island
Second Empire architecture in Rhode Island
Houses completed in 1884
Houses in Providence County, Rhode Island
Buildings and structures in Smithfield, Rhode Island
1884 establishments in Rhode Island
National Register of Historic Places in Providence County, Rhode Island